Podobeno ( or ) is a settlement north of Poljane nad Škofjo Loko in the Municipality of Gorenja Vas–Poljane in the Upper Carniola region of Slovenia.

Notable people
Notable people that were born or lived in Podobeno include:
Anton Kržišnik (1890–1973), judge and politician

References

External links 

Podobeno on Geopedia

Populated places in the Municipality of Gorenja vas-Poljane